Bidugadeya Bedi is a 1985 Indian Kannada-language film, directed by Dorai–Bhagavan, based on the novel of the same name by Ta Ra Su. The film stars Anant Nag and Lakshmi.

The film's score and  songs were composed by Rajan–Nagendra.

Plot 
Despite her father's objection, a young and beautiful daughter of a millionaire elopes with a poor man and faces lots of hardship. The story revolves around how her destiny takes its course.

Cast 
 Anant Nag
 Lakshmi
 K. S. Ashwath
 Umashri
 Dinesh
 Kanchana
 Vijaya Ranjini
 Mandeep Roy

Soundtrack 
The music was composed by the Rajan–Nagendra duo, with lyrics by R. N. Jayagopal.

References

External links 
 

1985 films
1980s Kannada-language films
Indian drama films
Films based on Indian novels
Films scored by Rajan–Nagendra
Films directed by Dorai–Bhagavan